Healthcare in Laos is provided by both the private and public sector. It is limited in comparison with other countries.  Western medical care is available in some locations, but remote areas and ethnic groups are underserved. Public spending on healthcare is low compared with neighbouring countries. Still, progress has been made since Laos joined the World Health Organization in 1950: life expectancy at birth rose to 66 years by 2015; malaria deaths and tuberculosis prevalence have plunged; and the maternal mortality ratio (MMR) has declined by 75 percent.

Although diets are not grossly inadequate, chronic moderate vitamin and protein deficiencies are common, particularly among upland ethnic groups. Poor sanitation and the prevalence of several tropical diseases continue to erode the health of the population.

The Human Rights Measurement Initiative finds that Laos is fulfilling 78.7% of what it should be fulfilling for the right to health based on its level of income. When looking at the right to health with respect to children, Laos achieves 88.2% of what is expected based on its current income. In regards to the right to health amongst the adult population, the country achieves only 84.1% of what is expected based on the nation's level of income. Laos falls into the "very bad" category when evaluating the right to reproductive health because the nation is fulfilling only 63.7% of what the nation is expected to achieve based on the resources (income) it has available.

Life expectancy 

The life expectancy at birth for men and women in Laos was estimated in 1988 at forty-nine years, the same as in Cambodia but at least ten years lower than in any other Southeast Asian nation. High child and infant mortality rates strongly affected this figure, with the Ministry of Public Health estimating the infant mortality rate at 109 per 1,000 and the under-five mortality rate at 180 per 1,000 in 1988. The United Nations Children's Fund (UNICEF—see Glossary) believed these figures underestimated the true mortality rate but still represented decreases from comparable rates in 1960. Regional differences were great. Whereas the infant mortality rate for Vientiane was about 50 per 1,000, in some remote rural areas it was estimated to be as high as 350 per 1,000 live births; that is, 35 percent of all children died before the age of one.

Children's deaths are primarily due to communicable diseases, with malaria, acute respiratory infections, and diarrhea the main causes of mortality as well as morbidity. Vaccination against childhood diseases was expanding, but in 1989 Vientiane's municipal authorities still were unable to vaccinate more than 50 percent of targeted children. Other provinces have much lower rates of immunization. Malaria is widespread among both adults and children, with the parasite Plasmodium falciparum involved in 80 to 90 percent of the cases.

Health status

Malaria 
In the first malaria eradication program between 1956 and 1960, DDT was sprayed over much of the country. Since 1975 the government has steadily increased its activities to eliminate malaria. The Ministry of Public Health operates provincial stations to monitor and combat malaria through diagnosis and treatment. Prevention measures involve chemical prophylaxis to high-risk groups, elimination of mosquito breeding sites, and promotion of individual protection. The campaign has had some success: the ministry reported a decline in the infected population from 26 percent to 15 percent between 1975 and 1990.

Diarrheal diseases 
As of 1993, diarrheal diseases were also common, with regular outbreaks occurring annually at the beginning of the rainy season when drinking water is contaminated by human and animal wastes washing down hillsides. Only a few rural households have pit or water seal toilets, and people commonly relieve themselves in the brush or forested areas surrounding each village. For children in these villages, many of whom are chronically undernourished, acute or chronic diarrhea is life-threatening because it results in dehydration and can precipitate severe malnutrition.

Nutrition 
Although nutrition appears to be marginal in the general population, health surveys are of varying quality. Some data indicate that stunting—low height for age—in the under-five population ranged from 2 to 35 percent, while wasting—low weight for height—probably does not exceed 10 percent of the under-five population. These figures reflect village diets based predominantly on rice, with vegetables as a common accompaniment and animal protein—fish, chicken, and wild foods—eaten irregularly. Children aged six months to two years—the weaning period—are particularly susceptible to malnutrition.

The nutritional status of adults is related closely to what is being grown on the family farm, as well as to dietary habits. For example, fresh vegetables and fruits are not highly valued and therefore are not consumed in adequate amounts. As a result, it is likely that vitamin A, iron, and calcium deficiencies are common in all parts of the country.

HIV/AIDS

Permissive attitudes of Laotian men toward sex and prostitution facilitated the transmission of human immunodeficiency virus (HIV) during the 1980s and 1990s, making HIV infection and acquired immune deficiency syndrome (AIDS) a growing concern. In 1992 a focused sample of about 7,600 urban residents identified one AIDS case and fourteen persons who tested HIV positive. No other statistics were available as of mid-1994.

Maternal and child health 
The 2010 maternal mortality rate per 100,000 births for Lao People's Democratic Republic is 580. This is compared with 339.2 in 2008 and 1215.4 in 1990.

The under 5 mortality rate, per 1,000 births is 61 and the neonatal mortality as a percentage of under 5's mortality is 38. In Lao People's Democratic Republic the number of midwives per 1,000 live births is 2 and the lifetime risk of death for pregnant women 1 in 49.

Health infrastructure

Despite government promises that the urban-oriented health system inherited from the RLG would be expanded to support rural primary health care and preventative programs, little money had been allocated to the health sector as of 1993. According to figures from 1988, less than five percent of the total government budget was targeted for health, with the result that the Ministry of Public Health was unable to establish a management and planning system to facilitate the changes envisioned. UNICEF considered the effort to construct a primary health care system to have failed entirely.

Official statistics identified hospitals in fifteen of the sixteen provinces, plus several in Vientiane, and clinics in 110 districts and more than 1,000 tasseng (subdistricts). In reality, most subdistrict clinics are unstaffed, unequipped, and unsupplied, and in 1989 only twenty of the district clinics actually provided services. The physical condition of the facilities is poor, with clean water and latrines unavailable at most health posts, and electricity unavailable at 85 percent of district clinics, rendering vaccine storage impossible. Drugs and equipment stored in the central warehouses are seldom distributed to outlying provinces, and in most situations, patients had to purchase Western pharmaceuticals from private pharmacies that imported stock from Thailand or Vietnam.

The number of health care personnel has been increasing since 1975, and in 1990 the ministry reported 1,095 physicians, 3,313 medical assistants, and 8,143 nurses. Most personnel are concentrated in the Vientiane area, where the population per physician ratio (1,400 to one) is more than ten times higher than in the provinces. In 1989 the national ratio was 2.6 physicians per 10,000 persons.

Training medical personnel at all levels emphasizes theory at the expense of practical skills and relies on curricula similar to those used prior to 1975. International foreign aid donors supported plans for a school of public health, and texts were written and published in Lao. As of 1990, however, the school did not exist, because of delays in approval of its structure and difficulties in finding trainers with the appropriate background.

Rural and provincial health personnel work under conditions similar to their counterparts in education: salaries are low and seldom paid on time, necessary equipment and supplies are unavailable, and superiors offer little supervision or encouragement. In these circumstances, morale is low, job attendance sporadic, and most health care ineffectual. In general, the population has little confidence in the health care sector, although some village medics and a few district or provincial hospitals are respected by their communities.

Use of traditional medical practitioners remains important in urban as well as rural locations.  Healers who know how to use medicinal plants are often consulted for common illnesses. The Institute of Traditional Medicine of the Ministry of Public Health formulated and marketed a number of preparations from medicinal plants. Spirit healers are also important for many groups, in some cases using medicinal plants but often relying on rituals to identify a disease and effect a cure. Many Laotians found no contradiction in consulting both spirit curers and Western-trained medical personnel.

In the absence of a widespread system of health workers, local shops selling drugs became an important source of medicines and offered advice on prescriptions. However, these pharmacies are unregulated and their owners unlicensed. As a consequence, misprescription is common, both of inappropriate drugs and incorrect dosages. In rural areas, vendors commonly make up small packets of drugs—typically including an antibiotic, several vitamins, and a fever suppressant—and sell them as single-dose cures for a variety of ailments.

Official ambulances are mainly used to transfer patients between hospitals and charge patients for their services. In 2010, a group of volunteers established Vientiane Rescue to operate the country's first free ambulance service around the clock. Vientiane Rescue includes more than 200 volunteers and operated from four locations in Vientiane. The service consists of eight ambulances, including the country's first Emergency Medical Service; a one-truck fire-fighting unit; a one-boat scuba rescue team as well as specialised hydraulic rescue and excavation teams. Vientiane Rescue responds to 15–30 accidents a day and between 2011 and 2015 helped save an estimated ten thousand lives. For its contribution to saving Laotian lives, Vientiane Rescue was awarded the 2016 Ramon Magsaysay Award, commonly regarded as Asia's equivalent of the Nobel Prize.

See also
 Vientiane Rescue
 Lao Red Cross Society
 Mahosot Hospital
 Water supply and sanitation in Laos

References